Karola Zala (1 October 1879 – 13 January 1970) was a Hungarian actress. She was born in 
Nagyvárad, Austria-Hungary (now, Oradea, Romania) and died in Budapest.

Selected filmography
 Spring Shower (1932)
 Emmy (1934)
 Spring Parade (1934)
 Pogányok (1937)
 Azurexpress (1938)
 Billeting (1938)
 Pusztai királykisasszony (1939)
 Unknown Opponent (1940)
 Don't Ask Who I Was (1941)
 Kadétszerelem (1942)
 Professor Hannibal (1956)

Bibliography
 Mitchell, Charles P. The Great Composers Portrayed on Film, 1913 through 2002. McFarland, 2004.

External links

1879 births
1970 deaths
Hungarian film actresses
Hungarian silent film actresses
People from Oradea